"Don't Look Down" is a song by Dutch DJ and record producer Martin Garrix, featuring vocals from American singer Usher. It was released as a digital download on 17 March 2015 on iTunes.

Background
Talking about his collaboration with Usher, Garrix said: "I had the track and he was at my manager Scooter’s house when I sent it over. Next thing I knew, I was on a FaceTime call with Usher, who said, 'I would love to do the track.' A week later, we were in the studio. It was super quick!" He also said the song is about "focusing on the positive side of everything."

Composition and critical reception
"Don't Look Down" is written in the key of A minor with a tempo of 130 beats per minute.  The song follows a chord progression of AmFC, and Usher's vocals span from G3 to C5.

Billboard Jason Lipshutz wrote, "Dutch EDM wunderkind Martin Garrix pivots from his standard sinister instrumental bangers and puts on his best David Guetta mask for 'Don't Look Down'. Usher has toed the now-or-never party line many times before, but his spirited vocals and a cheerful xylophone drop make this collabo a pop winner". Another Billboard contributor, Matt Madved, also noted Guetta's influences, with Garrix "ditching harder-edged trappings of festival house for cheery guitar-backed verses and a softer melodic lead". Idolator's Robbie Daw called it "a nice blend of dance beats and radio-friendly pop that should be music to programmers’ ears."

Music video
A lyric video directed by Rory Kramer showing a man quitting his job and enjoying life was released on 17 March 2015. Two official music videos were released on 23 March 2015 giving a female and male perspective of work at a country club.

Charts

Weekly charts

Year-end charts

Certifications

Release history

References

2015 singles
Martin Garrix songs
Usher (musician) songs
2015 songs
Spinnin' Records singles
Songs written by Martin Garrix
Songs written by Usher (musician)
Songs written by busbee
Songs written by James Abrahart